José David Leudo Romaña (born 9 November 1993) is a Colombian footballer who plays as a midfielder for Argentine Primera División club Rosario Central.

Club career
Leudo made his professional debut on 14 March 2009, in a 1–1 away draw against América de Cali.

In 2010, Leudo joined Uruguayan Primera División side CA Fénix, but failed to make an appearance for the club; the following year he joined Argentine Primera División club Estudiantes de La Plata, after an unsuccessful trial at Boca Juniors.

NorthEast United FC

On 28 August 2018, Leudo moved abroad and joined Indian Super League franchise NorthEast United FC.
On 1 December 2018 he was awarded as the hero of the match due to his passing accuracy.

References

External links

1993 births
Living people
People from Apartadó
Colombian footballers
Colombia youth international footballers
Colombia under-20 international footballers
Sportspeople from Antioquia Department
Association football midfielders
Boyacá Chicó F.C. footballers
Centro Atlético Fénix players
Estudiantes de La Plata footballers
Club Atlético Colón footballers
Once Caldas footballers
Deportivo Pasto footballers
C.D. Veracruz footballers
Atlético Huila footballers
NorthEast United FC players
Patriotas Boyacá footballers
Rosario Central footballers
Categoría Primera A players
Uruguayan Primera División players
Argentine Primera División players
Liga MX players
Indian Super League players
Colombian expatriate footballers
Colombian expatriate sportspeople in Argentina
Colombian expatriate sportspeople in Uruguay
Colombian expatriate sportspeople in Mexico
Colombian expatriate sportspeople in India
Expatriate footballers in Argentina
Expatriate footballers in Uruguay
Expatriate footballers in Mexico
Expatriate footballers in India